(1123 – 11 February 1160) was the head of the Minamoto clan and a general of the late Heian period of Japanese history.  His son Minamoto no Yoritomo became shōgun and founded the Kamakura shogunate, the first shogunate in the history of Japan.

His Dharma name was Shōjō Juin (勝定寿院).

Hōgen Rebellion
With the outbreak of the Hōgen Rebellion in 1156, the members of the Minamoto and Taira samurai clans were beckoned into the conflict.  Yoshitomo sided along with Taira no Kiyomori in support of the Emperor Go-Shirakawa and Fujiwara no Tadamichi, while his father Minamoto no Tameyoshi sided with the retired Emperor Sutoku and Fujiwara no Yorinaga.  Yoshitomo, defeating his father and the forces of Sutoku and Yorinaga,  became head of the Minamoto and established himself as a political power in the capital of Kyoto.  However, despite his attempts to have his father pardoned, Tameyoshi was executed.  Also, the outcome of the Hōgen rebellion established the Minamoto and Taira as the two strongest political rivals in the country.

Heiji Rebellion
Three years later in 1159, Yoshitomo and Fujiwara no Nobuyori placed Go-Shirakawa under house arrest and killed his retainer, the scholar Fujiwara no Michinori, in what is called the Heiji Rebellion.  Eventually, Taira no Kiyomori, in support of Go-Shirakawa, defeated Yoshitomo.

While escaping from Kyoto, Yoshitomo was forced to kill his son Tomonaga.  Later, Yoshitomo was betrayed and killed in his bath. Three of his sons, Minamoto no Yoritomo, Minamoto no Yoshitsune and Minamoto no Noriyori, were later spared and exiled by Kiyomori.  However, Yoshihira and Nobuyori were executed.

His grave in Aichi Prefecture is surrounded on all sides by wooden swords (bokuto), as by legend his last words were "If only I had even a bokuto..."

Family
Yoshitomo fathered five sons in total. His two sons, Yoshihira and Tomonaga, lost their lives following the Minamoto Clan's defeat in the Heiji Rebellion in 1160. At the time of the outbreak of the Genpei War in 1180, Minamoto no Yoritomo was his eldest surviving son. His other two surviving sons were Minamoto no Noriyori and Minamoto no Yoshitsune.

 Father: Minamoto no Tameyoshi (源為義, 1096–1156)
 Mother: Daughter of Fujiwara no Tadakiyo (藤原忠清の娘)
 Wife: Yura Gozen (由良御前, ?–1159), "Urahime" (由良姫), daughter of Fujiwara no Suenori (藤原季範).
 Concubine: Tokiwa Gozen (常盤御前, 1138–c.1180)
 1st son: Minamoto no Yoshihira (源義平, 1140–1160)
 2nd son: Minamoto no Tomonaga (源朝長, 1144–1160)
 3rd son: Minamoto no Yoritomo (源頼朝, 1147–1199)
 4th son: Minamoto no Yoshikado (源義門, ?–?)
 5th son: Minamoto no Mareyoshi (源希義, 1152–1180 or 1182)
 6th son: Minamoto no Noriyori (源範頼, 1150–1193)
 7th son: Ano Zenjō (阿野全成, 1153–1203)
 8th son: Gien (義円, 1155–1181)
 9th son: Minamoto no Yoshitsune (源義経, 1159–1189)

See also
 Siege of Shirakawa-den
 Siege of Sanjō Palace

References

Bibliography
Turnbull, Stephen (1998). The Samurai Sourcebook. London: Cassell & Co. page 60.

Minamoto no Yoshitomo
Minamoto no Yoshitomo
Minamoto clan
People of Heian-period Japan
Heian period Buddhists